TG Keerthi Kumar (born 8 March 1984) is an Indian film director, in the Telugu cinema industry. Keerthi was born in Chennai. He graduated from St.Joseph's Engineering College, Chennai and post graduated from Loyola College, Chennai. His films include Malli Modalaindi 
Along with his next big starrer, he's has also been roped in for long formats with the leading OTT's.

Career

This tale of love finding love after divorce is a mixed bag starring Sumanth, Naina Ganguly, Varshini Sounderajan, Vennela Kishore, and others in lead roles, that streamed on ZEE5 on 11th February 2022. He stated that he was inspired to write Malli Modalandi based on a real incident in his friend's life, who got divorced and married later. He worked on the script in lockdown. He is known to have a quirk style in writing and has often been acknowledged for intelligent and unique storytelling while entertaining audience thoroughly. He is working on multiple projects, which also includes OTT shows with some of the reputed platforms.  Apart from these two films, he also directed "Oru Modhal Oru Kadhal" in 2014.

References 

Indian film directors
1984 births
Living people